24 Carat Purple is the first compilation album of the hard rock band Deep Purple released worldwide on their own record company and the third in a long line of compilation albums. It was released in May 1975.

The live version of "Black Night", here on LP for the first time, was recorded in Japan in 1972, and originally appeared as the B-side of "Woman From Tokyo".

Track listing

Personnel

Deep Purple 

 Ian Gillan – vocals
 Ritchie Blackmore – guitar
 Roger Glover – bass 
 Jon Lord – keyboards
 Ian Paice – drums
 Martin Birch – engineer

Charts

Weekly charts

Year-end charts

Certifications and sales

References 

1975 compilation albums
Deep Purple compilation albums
Albums recorded at IBC Studios
Purple Records compilation albums